Wilford Lloyd Baumes (born 1939) is an American screenwriter and producer. He is known for serving as the developer of the American romantic comedy drama The Love Boat, which was based on the 1974 book The Love Boats, by Jeraldine Saunders.

Baumes was the brother of Hayward Hudson Baumes. He had mostly worked on some television films including, The Dead Don't Die, Nightmare in Badham County and Alexander: The Other Side of Dawn. Baumes also produced Wonder Woman. He was a resident of Santa Barbara, California.

References

External links 

 

1939 births
Living people
American television writers
American male television writers
American television producers
American male screenwriters
20th-century American screenwriters
20th-century American male writers